The Northwestern State Demons football program is the intercollegiate American football team for Northwestern State University located in the U.S. state of Louisiana. The team competes in the NCAA Division I Football Championship Subdivision (FCS) and is a member of the Southland Conference. Northwestern State's first football team was fielded in 1907. The team plays its home games at the 15,971 seat Harry Turpin Stadium in Natchitoches, Louisiana.

History

Northwestern State football has the distinction of being the only NCAA division IAA/FCS member to have 2 NFL rookies of the year. In 1981, Joe Delaney, running back for the Kansas City Chiefs, was awarded the AFC Rookie of the year by UPI. In 1988, John Stephens, running back for the New England Patriots, was named Offensive/AFC Rookie of the year. No other 4-year institution in the state of Louisiana has more than one.

Conference affiliations 
 Independent (1907–1913, 1926–1927, 1971, 1976–1977)
 Louisiana Intercollegiate Athletic Association (1914–1925)
 SIAA (1928–1941)
 Louisiana Intercollegiate Conference (1942–1947)
 Gulf States Conference (1948–1970)
 Gulf South Conference (1972–1974)
 Division II Independent (1975)
 Division I-AA Independent (1978–1983)
 Gulf Star Conference (1984–1986)
 Southland Conference (1987–present)

Championships

Conference championships 
Northwestern State has 12 conference championships.

† Co-champions

Division I-AA/FCS Playoffs results
The Demons have appeared in the I-AA/FCS playoffs six times with an overall record of 3–6.

Rivalries

McNeese State

McNeese State leads the series 45–22–1 through the 2018 season.

Nicholls

Northwestern State leads the series with Nicholls 28–18 through the 2018 season.

Southeastern Louisiana

Southeastern Louisiana leads the series 28–22 through the 2018 season.

Stephen F. Austin
Battle for Chief Caddo

Each season, Stephen F. Austin State University of Nacogdoches, Texas and Northwestern State play for the country's largest football trophy. In 1961, longtime rivals SFA and Northwestern State decided to award the winner of the game a trophy, the game was won by Northwestern State University. According to the stipulations of that particular match, the loser would have to present the winner with a tree chopped down from a nearby forest.

In March 1962, the Lumberjacks of SFA in Nacogdoches, Texas, presented NSU with a black gum tree trunk from the SFA campus from which a statue was to be carved. The black gum tree weighed over a ton and was thirty inches in diameter. An Indian statue, Chief Caddo, was chosen because of the historic founding of Natchitoches, Louisiana and Nacogdoches, Texas by Indian tribes. Natchitoches means chinquapin eaters and Nacogdoches means persimmon eaters. It was carved by Harold Greene in Logansport and required over 200 hours of labor. The name “Chief Indian Caddo” was selected in honor of the ancient federation of Caddo Indian tribes, which once inhabited the northern Louisiana area. The final painting of the statue was done at Northwestern. The finished product stands around 7.6 feet tall and weighs about 320 pounds. The first game for Chief Caddo was September 15, 1962. Northwestern won 23–6. Tradition has it that the winner of the annual NSU and SFA football game keeps Chief Caddo on their respective campus. Currently, Chief Caddo is the largest college football trophy in the nation.

Louisiana–Monroe

In the 1992 edition of the rivalry game, the teams' mascots Vic the Demon and Chief Brave Spirit got involved in a fight that distracted television cameras to the point that the entire altercation is caught on video. In the scuffle, Vic the Demon's head is ripped off as the two crashed to the ground behind one of the end zones, which according to the video clip breaks a "cardinal rule" of being a mascot. The melee was broken up by college police without further incident.  The game was last played in 2005.  Northwestern State leads the series with Louisiana–Monroe 28–19–1.

Notable former players
Notable alumni include:
 Demetress Bell - Buffalo Bills and Philadelphia Eagles
 Mark Duper – Miami Dolphins
 Adrian Hardy – San Francisco 49ers and Cincinnati Bengals
 Jamall Johnson – Hamilton Tiger Cats 
 Shelton Eppler - Aalborg 89ers and Fundidores de Monterrey
 Jermaine Jones - New York Jets, Chicago Bears, Dallas Cowboys
 Joe Delaney – Inductee of College Football Hall of Fame - Kansas City Chiefs
 Al Edwards - Buffalo Bills
 Mike Green - Chicago Bears, Seattle Seahawks, Washington Redskins
 Adrian Hardy - San Francisco 49ers and Cincinnati Bengals 
 Bobby Hebert – New Orleans Saints and Atlanta Falcons
 Jamall Johnson - BC Lions and Hamilton Tiger Cats
 Jeremy Lane – Seattle Seahawks
 Monte Ledbetter – Houston Oilers, Buffalo Bills, Atlanta Falcons
 Terrence McGee - Buffalo Bills 
 Craig Nall - Green Bay Packers, Buffalo Bills, Houston Texans
 Ed Orgeron – former LSU Tigers Head Coach
 Petey Perot - Philadelphia Eagles and New Orleans Saints
 David Pittman - Baltimore Ravens
 T-Dre Player – BC Lions
 Gary Reasons – Inductee of College Football Hall of Fame - New York Giants and Cincinnati Bengals
Barry Rubin (born 1957) - Head Strength and Conditioning Coach of the Kansas City Chiefs in the National Football League
 Deon Simon - New York Jets
 Jackie Smith - Inductee of Pro Football Hall of Fame - St. Louis Cardinals and Dallas Cowboys 
 Marcus Spears - Chicago Bears, Kansas City Chiefs, Houston Texans
 John Stephens – New England Patriots
 Keith Thibodeaux - Washington Redskins, Minnesota Vikings, Green Bay Packers
 Sidney Thornton - Pittsburgh Steelers
 Charlie Tolar - Houston Oilers
 Floyd Turner - New Orleans Saints, Indianapolis Colts, Baltimore Ravens
 Odessa Turner - New York Giants and San Francisco 49ers
 Kenny Wright - Minnesota Vikings, Houston Texans, Jacksonville Jaguars, Washington Redskins

Future non-conference opponents 
Announced schedules as of June 25, 2022.

See also
List of NCAA Division I FCS football programs

References

External links
 

 
American football teams established in 1907
1907 establishments in Louisiana